Mufti Abdul Sattar is a Pakistani politician who has been a member of Senate of Pakistan, since March 2012.

Political career
He was elected to the Senate of Pakistan as a candidate of Jamiat Ulema-e Islam (F) in 2012 Pakistani Senate election.

References

Living people
Pakistani senators (14th Parliament)
Jamiat Ulema-e-Islam (F) politicians
Year of birth missing (living people)